Cornell bread was invented in the United States during World War II by Clive McCay, a professor at Cornell University, as an inexpensive alternative to strictly rationed foods. Adding powdered milk and soy flour to bread increases its protein content, and restoring the germ to refined white flour results in higher levels of vitamins and minerals. The recipe for the bread was published in a book co-authored by McCay and his wife, entitled The Cornell Bread Book: 54 Recipes for Nutritious Loaves, Rolls & Coffee Cakes.

See also
 Brown bread
 Graham cracker
 Health food
 List of breads

References

External links
 Cornell bread at the Cornell University website

American breads